Rabbi Yaakov Moshe Hillel (born August 29, 1945) is the head of the Kabbalah Yeshiva Ahavat Shalom in Jerusalem. He has been described as a prolific author and publisher of sefarim. Most of his works are about Kabbalah.

Among his primary students are Rabbis Daniel Frisch (he) and Shimshon Dovid Pincus.

Biography
He was born in Mumbai, India to Moshe Hillel (grandson of Rabbi Avraham Hillel who served as a rabbi in Iraq). In adulthood he lived in England, studied at the Gateshead Yeshiva, and later immigrated to Israel and studied at the Ponevezh Yeshiva in Bnei Brak, where he became attached to and became a Talmid Muvhak of Rav Shach.

He married Ziona, daughter of Rabbi Yitzhak Ohana, who was the chief rabbi of Kiryat Shmona.

After marrying he studied at the Dayan and Rabbinical Training Institute established by Rishon Lezion, Rabbi Yitzhak Nissim, and at the Harry Fishel Institute. Among other things, he learned the basics of Kabbalah from Rabbi Mordechai Attia (the grandfather).

Among the organizations he created are:
 He founded a yeshiva named Ahavat Shalom in the early 1970s, at which he began his daily classes in Kabbalah. Ahavat Shalom is the third biggest Yeshivah in the world, after Lakewood's and Mir.
 Used his (British) English-speaking background from his education at Gateshead to facilitate his Kiruv work.
 Founded a girl's seminary, Bnos Elisheva, in 2002.

Personal
He had 19 children. Prior to marrying, he was an artist, hence the title of Kol Hazman's biography: From Artist/Painter to Genius Kabbalist."

Works
Many of the titles that use the word Yam ( or י"ם) refer to Hillel's initials, Yud Mem (for Yaakov Moshe). Similarly, HaYam adds the letter Hay (ה), for Hillel.

His books are:

 (5754) VaYaShav HaYam - She'elot U'Teshuvot (3 volume set; volume 3: 5772) - Volume 1 is about practical yet technical aspects of writing Torah scrolls and Tefillin. 
 (5772) VaYaShav HaYam (Volume 3) - She'elot U'Teshuvot - Practical aspects, foundational issues, Shulchan Aruch (Code of Jewish Law)
 (5760) HaVayn BeChochma (understand with wisdom) - (3 volumes) Articles and Notes on Kabbalah Theory and Intention of the Rash
 (5765) Aid HaGaL HaZeh - about Lag BaOmer and Rashbi (Rabbi Shimon bar YoChai)
 (5768) Aspaklariya DeNahara  - Annotation on the Preface of the River Streets of the Rash.  Contains two commentaries: one called "Nahara uPashta" and the other named "MayAmKay HaYam."
 (5771) GeVurot Ha-Ari - Answers and Articles on resolving halachic and Kabalistic disputes
 (5772) GaLay HaYam - about the morning prayers in the synagogue (and praying with devotion)
 (5772) Sefat HaYam - a seven volume set:
 Sefat HaYam:  Rosh HaShanah,Sukkot & Shavuot
 Sefat HaYam: Sefirat HaOmer
 Sefat HaYam: Seuda & Birkat HaNeHeNin
 Topics of the other four volumes include ShoVaVim, Chanukah and Purim.

 (5777) Ruach HaYam - assorted conversations and articles (22 chapters): Kiruv, Peter Chamor, laws dealing with a new Sefer Torah, the mitzvah of Torah study, preventing desecration of graves, proper inspection of Torah scrolls & Tefillin.
 Ruach HaYam - Hespedim (eulogies): a same-year publication of Divrei Hesped for Rav Shach, Rav Elyashiv, and 11 others. Also has 4 more chapters done in honor/in memory of.
 (5778) Pe'At HaYam al Shaar HaKaVaNot - writings about Passover, the counting of the Omer, and Shavuot.
 (57xx) PeTach Shaar HaShamayim & Binyan Ariel - about studying Kabbalah (who should, how, when)
 (57xx/74) Shorshei HaYam at Etz Chaim (5 volumes) - teachings based on Chaim Vital's Etz Chaim.

English
 Faith and Folly: The Occult in Torah Perspective was originally published in Hebrew as Tamim Tiheyeh.
 Ascending Jacob's Ladder - a collection of essays on basic Jewish topics (Shabbat/Holidays, Prayers, Torah study), based on "Midrash, Mussar, and Kabbalah."
 Roni Akarah: A Guide for the Childless
 (EDITOR) The Ben Ish Hai: The Life and Legacy of Rabbi Yosef Hayym
 Ascending The Path (5 Vol.) on Mesillat Yesharim.  It clarifies and defines the relevance of the Mesillat Yesharim to our daily lives and includes many new concepts and explanations to aid the reader's progress along the path of the just.

Manuscripts/editing
He also edited works, based on existing manuscripts, on various Halachic topics:
 Bein ZroOs Olam - regarding positioning of a bed 
 Oter Yisroel BeSifAra - regarding Rashi and Rabbeinu Tam's Tefillin; whether they may both be worn simultaneously.
 VaYaTzetz Tzitz - Kabbalistic view on having the fringes of the "minor" Talis (Arba Kanfot/Talis Katan) should be visible.
 Yismach Moshe - regarding laws of mourning.

Publisher
Hillel oversees publication of works published by his yeshiva, including Rabbi Eliyahu Eliezer Dessler's novellae on the Talmud,  with an introduction written by Hillel.

Controversy
In an article about Hillel's 3 volume set "Kitvuni LeDorot" Yosef Avivi (he) alleged that large parts of the book were plagiarized from Avivi's book Binyan Ariel'', not to be confused with Hillel's book of the same name.

MeKavTsiel magazine
His teachings are also published in MeKavTsiel magazine.

Darchei link
As a Sephardic sage, he has been visiting Yeshiva Darchei Torah (Far Rockaway) since 2004.

Additional reading
The Boundaries of the Kabbalah: R. Yaakov Moshe Hillel and the Kabbalah in Jerusalem - Jonatan Meir

References

External links
 photo of Rabbi Yaakov Moshe Hillel (Hebrew Wikipedia)

20th-century rabbis in Jerusalem
21st-century rabbis in Jerusalem
Haredi rabbis in Israel
1945 births
Living people